Simon Atallah, OAM (born on 10 January 1937 in Hemayri, Lebanon) is a Lebanese Maronite emeritus eparch of the Maronite Catholic Eparchy of Baalbek-Deir El Ahmar.

Life

Simon Atallah joined the OAM and received on 8 December 1963 his ordination to the priesthood. The General Chapter elected him in 1999 Superior general of his order. The Synod of the Maronite Church elected him on 24 September 2005 eparch of Baalbek-Deir El Ahmar. Pope Benedict XVI confirmed this election on 28 December 2005.

His episcopal ordination was by the hands of the Maronite Patriarch of Antioch, Cardinal Nasrallah Boutros Sfeir, on February 11, 2006 and his co-consecrators were Roland Aboujaoudé, auxiliary bishop of Antioch, and Tanios El Khoury, emeritus bishop of Sidon.

Atallah exercised his office till March 14, 2015. The decision from 10 to 14 March 2015 of the Maronite Church's Synod convened to elect Hanna Rahme, OLM, as his successor. Pope Francis agreed with this election on 20 June 2015.

References

External links

 http://www.catholic-hierarchy.org/bishop/batal.html
 http://www.gcatholic.org/dioceses/diocese/baal1.htm

1937 births
Lebanese clergy
Living people
21st-century Maronite Catholic bishops